John Paul Spencer Bloomfield (born 1956) is an English sport shooter, specialising in Full-Bore Rifle.

Sport shooting career
Bloomfield represented England and won a silver medal in the fullbore rifle Queens Prize (open), at the 1982 Commonwealth Games in Brisbane, Queensland, Australia. Four years later he represented England and won a bronze medal in the fullbore rifle Queens Prize (open), at the 1986 Commonwealth Games in Edinburgh, Scotland.

He won H.M. The Queen's Prize at Bisley twice, in 1985 and 1990 and H.E. The Governor General's Prize in Canada in 1978.

References

1956 births
Living people
English male sport shooters
Commonwealth Games silver medallists for England
Commonwealth Games bronze medallists for England
Shooters at the 1982 Commonwealth Games
Shooters at the 1986 Commonwealth Games
Commonwealth Games medallists in shooting
British male sport shooters
20th-century English people
Medallists at the 1982 Commonwealth Games
Medallists at the 1986 Commonwealth Games